Senftenberg station is a railway station in Senftenberg in the German state of Brandenburg. It is a through station at the railway junction of the Lübbenau-Kamenz, the Großenhain–Cottbus and the Schipkau–Senftenberg railways. It is classified by Deutsche Bahn as a category 5 station.

History 
The first station building was built in 1869 along with the line from Cottbus via Senftenberg and Großenhain to Dresden. In 1874, a second line, the Lübbenau–Kamenz railway was opened by the Berlin-Görlitz Railway Company. A second station building was built at that time.

As a result of extensions to handle the transport of lignite from the nearby lignite mining areas and the duplication of the line, the station building was rebuilt several times and expanded, most recently in 1927 during the raising of the tracks. The first tracks at Senftenberg were electrified in November 1987; all tracks exiting from Senftenberg have been operated electrically since 1990. The entrance building and the bus station in front of it were renovated and expanded after 1990.

After that the station lost its services one by one. Ticketing and services were closed or replaced by machines. The last shop was a hairdresser.

The entrance building still has a mural representing the town of Senftenberg. It is based on a view of the town in the 1970s.

Transport 

Today, the following services stop at the station:	.

References

External links
 
 

Railway stations in Brandenburg
Railway stations in Germany opened in 1869
Senftenberg
1869 establishments in Prussia